The Albatros B.I, (post-war company designation L.1) was a German military reconnaissance aircraft designed in 1913 and which saw service during World War I.

Design and development

The B.I was a two-seat biplane of conventional configuration that seated the observer and the pilot in separate cockpits in tandem. The wings were originally of three-bay design, but were later changed to a two-bay, unstaggered configuration; featuring a typical aileron control cable system for German aircraft of the time, that allowed for a horizontal control horn that fit into a structural pocket in the wing structure at neutral. A floatplane version was developed as the Albatros W.I.

Variants
B.I German production aircraft for the Luftstreitkräfte
Phönix 20.01First prototype for Austrian production.
Phönix 20.02second prototype for Austrian production.
B.I(Ph) series 21Production by Phönix Flugzeug-Werke AG at Vienna for the Austro-Hungarian Imperial and Royal Aviation Troops.
B.I(Ph) series 24Production by Phönix Flugzeug-Werke AG at Vienna for the Austro-Hungarian Imperial and Royal Aviation Troops.
B.I(Ph) series 25Production by Phönix Flugzeug-Werke AG at Vienna, with the KNV (Knoller Verspannung) for the Austro-Hungarian Imperial and Royal Aviation Troops; 48 ordered, reduced to 16 due to delays and persistent problems.

Operational history
The B.Is were withdrawn from front line service in 1915 but some examples served as trainers for the remainder of the war.

Operators

 Austro-Hungarian Imperial and Royal Aviation Troops

 Bulgarian Air Force

 Luftstreitkräfte
 Kaiserliche Marine

 Royal Netherlands Air Force

 The Polish Air Force operated this type postwar.

 Romanian Air Corps - One Albatros purchased from Germany in 1913

 Ottoman Air Force

Survivors

The Phönix 20.01, prototype for Austrian production of the Albatros B.I(Ph), is preserved at the Heeresgeschichtliches Museum in Vienna.

Specifications (B.I)

See also

References

Bibliography

Biplanes
Single-engined tractor aircraft
1910s German military reconnaissance aircraft
B.I
Aircraft first flown in 1913